Madison National Bank, now known as Boone-Madison Public Library, is a historic bank building located at Madison, Boone County, West Virginia. It was built in 1918, and is a three-story, rectangular, brick building with a symmetrical limestone façade in the Beaux-Arts style. It has a flat roof and parapet. The front facade features a three-story, multi-light, arched window opening flanked on either side by Corinthian order pilasters.  The building housed a bank until 1974, when it was donated to the Library Commission.

It was listed on the National Register of Historic Places in 2007.

References

Bank buildings on the National Register of Historic Places in West Virginia
Beaux-Arts architecture in West Virginia
Commercial buildings completed in 1918
National Register of Historic Places in Boone County, West Virginia
Libraries on the National Register of Historic Places in West Virginia